Die goldene Gans  is an East German film, based on the fairy tale Golden Goose. It was released in 1964.

External links
 

1964 films
1960s children's fantasy films
German children's fantasy films
East German films
1960s German-language films
Films based on Grimms' Fairy Tales

Films_based_on_fairy_tales
1960s German films